Florentino Molina (born 30 December 1938) is an Argentine professional golfer.

Molina was born in Río Cuarto, Córdoba. He turned pro in 1960. He won the Argentine Open five times and the Argentine Professional Rankings four times. He played on the PGA Tour from 1975 to 1980 and the European Tour in 1981. He was second in French Open in 1970 and 4th in the B.C. Open in 1977. He was second in Argentine Open in 1962 and the Brazil Open in 1970.

Molina played in the British Open five times (1970, 1971, 1974, 1978 and 1981), and once in the U.S. Open (1977), when he was one of seven players tied for the lead after the first round.

In 2000, Molina was second in Miramar Grand Prix (TPG Tour) at the age of 61.

Professional wins

Canadian Tour wins (2)
1974 Atlantic Open
1975 Pine Tree Open

Argentine Tour wins (45)
1961 San Isidro Grand Prix
1962 La Cumbre Open
1963 La Cumbre Open, Acantilados Grand Prix, Necochea Grand Prix, Lincoln Grand Prix
1964 Sierra de los Padres Grand Prix, Buenos Aires Invitational Grand Prix
1966 La Cumbre Open
1967 Jockey Club Rosario Open
1970 Lomas Open, Palermo Grand Prix, Argentine PGA Championship
1971 Argentine Open, Center Open, Norpatagonico Open, San Martin Grand Prix
1973 Argentine Open
1975 Argentine Open, Abierto del Litoral, Acantilados Grand Prix
1976 Argentine Open, Fultom Grand Prix
1977 Argentine Open, Argentine Masters, Abierto del Litoral, Metropolitano Open, Rio Cuarto Open, Lomas Open
1978 Rio Cuarto Open
1979 Metropolitano Open
1980 Ituzaingo Grand Prix
1981 Center Open, Praderas Grand Prix, Metropolitano Open
1982 Acantilados Grand Prix, Ford Taunus Grand Prix
1983 San Martin Grand Prix, Pinamar Open
1984 Argentino Grand Prix, Lomas Pro-Am (with Miguel Prado)
1985 South Open, Carilo Grand Prix, La Cumbre Open
1986 Boulonge Grand Prix

South American wins (7)
1964 Santo Domingo Open (Chile), Lima Open (Peru)
1965 Uruguay Open
1967 Peru Open
1970 Ford Maracaibo Open
1973 Bogota Open (Colombia)
1974 Ford Maracaibo Open

Senior wins (9)
1991 Argentine Senior Open, Argentine Senior PGA Championship
1992 Argentine Senior PGA Championship
1993 Uruguay Senior Open, Argentine Senior Open
1994 Metropolitano Senior Open
1995 Argentine Senior PGA Championship, Acantilados Senior Grand Prix
1999 Acantilados Senior Grand Prix

Team appearances
World Cup (representing Argentina): 1967, 1971, 1978, 1982

See also 

 1974 PGA Tour Qualifying School graduates

References

External links

Argentine male golfers
PGA Tour golfers
European Tour golfers
Sportspeople from Córdoba Province, Argentina
People from Río Cuarto, Córdoba
1938 births
Living people